Nuclear Throne is a bullet hell roguelike video game developed by Vlambeer. Early prototypes of the game were distributed through Steam's early access program in 2013. Nuclear Throne was released for Linux, Microsoft Windows, OS X, PlayStation 4, and PlayStation Vita in December 2015, for Nintendo Switch in March 2019, and for Xbox One in September 2021.

Gameplay 

Nuclear Throne is a top-down shooter roguelike game with bullet hell elements. The game consists of two main game modes: single-player, and a local cooperative gameplay mode. There are also daily and weekly challenge modes, allowing the player to compete against others via the Steam platform for the best score (determined by the number of kills in the playthrough), on the same set of randomly generated levels. The player controls one of a total of 12 characters, 10 of which must be unlocked through play. Two additional secret characters can only be played under special circumstances during play. Each character has an ability unique to them, adding an additional element to the gameplay. These individual abilities allow for different play-styles, improving the variety and replay value of the game. Secondary sprites or skins can be acquired for the characters played if the player completes special or secret tasks. The player progresses through the linear level structure until level 7-3, where the final boss, the Nuclear Throne, has to be defeated. After this, the player may choose to loop to the beginning of the game again with a greatly increased difficulty. The user may continue looping indefinitely until death.

The game resets upon death. Except for special weapons acquired in a hidden level and "crowns" retained until after defeating the final boss, anything acquired in one playthrough does not carry over to the next. The game has a leveling system, where the player gains experience in the form of radiation pellets, or "rads", dropped by enemies, that allow them to get different mutations and choose what would benefit the character the most out of a selection of four, randomly selected mutations. Upon reaching level 10, the player can choose a character-specific "ultra-mutation".

The player starts with the basic revolver, but they may upgrade by taking weapons from red chests and collect more ammunition from yellow chests. The player can have two weapons equipped at any time, such as a shovel and an assault rifle. The weapons available to the player get increasingly advanced and powerful as the enemies become increasingly difficult and numerous. After looping the game, special "golden" and "ultra" weapons become available. Aside from certain melee weapons, weapons consume one of five different ammo types (bullet, energy, shell, bolt, and explosive).

Plot 
The plot of Nuclear Throne has been discussed amongst the community as a result of the developer's minimal contributions. Most of the theories and speculations have formed from analyzing the game's world, environment details and loading tips. Most canon information revealed by the developers was done during development livestreams.

Set in a post-apocalyptic world, the characters, called mutants, of Nuclear Throne have collected together with the aim of travelling throughout the world to reach the Nuclear Throne. The developers theorize each new run as a new alternate universe, a universe where everybody is alive and they have yet to decide who will attempt to complete the task.

Development 
Vlambeer's Jan Willem Nijman and Rami Ismail served as the game's designer and producer, respectively, and shared the development work. Paul Veer, who had previously animated Vlambeer's Super Crate Box, returned to contribute art to Nuclear Throne. The game's promotional art was drawn by Justin Chan, an art student hired on the basis of his fan art for early releases of the game. Nuclear Throne music was composed by Jukio Kallio, who had composed for several previous Vlambeer titles. A friend of Kallio's, Joonas Turner, worked on the sound effect design.

Jan Willem Nijman and Rami Ismael were invited by Notch, to participate in a 48-hour charity game jam called Mojam Humble in 2013. During this game jam the two created a game called Wasteland Kings which later became the prototype to Nuclear Throne. At the beginning of development, Nuclear Throne was created in Game Maker 7 before transitioning to Game Maker Studio to develop the rest of the product, a decision the team later found cumbersome. Nuclear Throne’s development was secondary to their other project at the time, Luftrausers, and the team often found themselves progressively adding new features before considering taking the game seriously as a commercial option. Nuclear Throne development took 2.5 years, beginning in February 2013 and releasing into Steam Early Access that same year. During PAX Prime 2013 Vlambeer showed off the prototype for Nuclear Throne, known as Wasteland Kings, with five of the twelve characters playable in the prototype. After the release of Nuclear Throne to early access, this prototype was made for public download. It was revealed by Rami Ismail that the name change was due primarily to a trademark issue with InXile Entertainment. Following the Mojam tradition of livestreaming the development process, the team decided to continue livestreaming their progress for Nuclear Throne which was a development process they later dubbed “Performative Game Development”. The livestreams offered opportunities for the developers to interact directly with their community and increase their game’s exposure to new audiences. Rami noticed a significant boost in exposure when other live streamers on the Twitch platform were interacting with and playing Nuclear Throne. For example, they had a significant sales spike when Northernlion, a content creator, played the game on stream. Vlambeer announced PlayStation 4 and Vita releases at the December 2015 PlayStation Experience keynote.

The aspect ratio of Nuclear Throne is permanently set to 4:3 instead of the industry standard 16:9. This was done to create an even balance of visual threats onscreen. Vlambeer generates their random levels using “workers”. This programming system creates tiles and walls beginning from the character with a random amount of distance it can cover. Once the walker reaches the end of its randomized distance it will place an item or object of interest such as an ammo crate or explosive barrel. Each region within the game has its own sets of random generation restrictions creating distinct differences between the progressive areas.

Release 

In January 2016, Vlambeer teamed up with the subscription box company, IndieBox, to offer a physical release of Nuclear Throne. This limited collector's edition included a themed USB drive with DRM-free game file, soundtrack, instruction manual, Steam key, and various custom-designed collectibles.

Reception 

Nuclear Throne has received positive reviews from critics, with the game's PS4 version scoring 82/100 on Metacritic, and the Windows version 89/100.

Alexander Chatziioannou of Hardcore Gamer gave the game a 4 out of 5 saying, "Nuclear Throne is impeccably presented and tightly designed. There is enough variety in characters, upgrades and weapons to ensure that playthroughs never get repetitive and its visceral combat is a joy in itself." Jordan Devore from Destructoid rated the game an 8/10 saying, "it's one of the hardest, most rewarding games I've ever played. But as satisfying as it can eventually become, I think it is far too demanding for its own good."

IGN awarded it a score of 9.0 out of 10, saying "Nuclear Throne is an enjoyably tough run-and-gun with tons of energy and variety to justify hours and hours of replays."

References

External links 

 

2015 video games
Fantasy video games
Indie video games
Linux games
Multiplayer and single-player video games
MacOS games
PlayStation 4 games
PlayStation Vita games
Roguelike video games
Video games using procedural generation
Shoot 'em ups
Shooter video games
Top-down video games
Video games developed in the Netherlands
Video games scored by Jukio Kallio
Vlambeer games
Windows games
Early access video games
GameMaker Studio games
Nintendo Switch games